George St George (2 July 1682 – 23 December 1762) was an Irish politician. He sat in the Irish House of Commons as a Member of Parliament (MP) for Athlone from 1723 to 1761.

He was the son of Henry St George of Wooodsgift, County Kilkenny, which had been granted to the St George family in 1666, and Ann Hatfield, daughter of Ridgely Hatfield, Alderman of Dublin.

He married Elizabeth Bligh, daughter of Thomas Bligh and Elizabeth Napier, and sister of John Bligh, 1st Earl of Darnley. They were the parents of Sir Richard St George, 1st Baronet.

References 

1682 births
1762 deaths
Members of the Parliament of Ireland (pre-1801) for Athlone
Irish MPs 1715–1727
Irish MPs 1727–1760
Irish MPs 1761–1768